Rajpur, Baroda was an Indian princely state located on the bank of river Mahisagar. Thakur Saheb Shree Mansinhji Fatehsinhji Maharaulji was the last Thakur Saheb of Rajpur. The history of the Rajput Royal family is associated with Lord Jaladhar Mahadevji.

Princely states of India